Shahal M. Khan (born New York, United States) is an American businessman. Khan is primarily known for his failed attempt to purchase the Plaza Hotel in New York City from the Sahara Group, alongside Kamran Hakim, for $600 million.

Career
Khan was one of the founders of Fortune Investment House, a Bahrain-based real estate investment bank, and Global Voice Telecom.

He was CEO of Centile, a French software company based in Monaco, from 2004 to 2006.

Khan helped found and served as vice chairman of Zebasolar, a solar energy company. He also served as a partner at GlobalTurk Capital, a Turkish merchant bank, from 2012 to 2016.

Plaza Hotel
In May 2018, Khan and Kamran Hakim, a prominent New York City landlord and property investor, entered into an agreement to purchase the Plaza Hotel, an historic and high-profile luxury property in Manhattan, for $600 million from Sahara India Pariwar, a London-based Indian conglomerate. The acquisition is partially financed through a $415 million loan from British real estate investors David and Simon Reuben.

Personal life
Khan was born in New York, United States, of Indian and Pakistani heritage. He received a bachelor's degree in economics from American University and a master's degree in international development from the Johns Hopkins University Nitze School of Advanced International Studies. Khan primarily resides in Washington, D.C., Dubai, and the Portuguese Riviera (Quinta da Beloura, Sintra).

References

Living people
American University alumni
Johns Hopkins University alumni
People from New York (state)
Businesspeople from Washington, D.C.
Year of birth missing (living people)